Albert Eugene "Gene" Carmichael, Jr. (1927 - February 21, 2014) was an American politician and businessman.

Born in Lake View, South Carolina, Carmichael served in the United States Army in Europe during World War II. He graduated from The Citadel, The Military College of South Carolina. Carmichael was in several businesses including fertilizer, textiles, gas station, and restaurant. He served in the South Carolina State Senate as a Democrat. Carmichael was sentenced in 1982 to ten years in prison for conspiracy to buy votes, obstruction of justice, and vote buying.

Notes

1927 births
2014 deaths
People from Dillon County, South Carolina
The Citadel, The Military College of South Carolina alumni
Businesspeople from South Carolina
Democratic Party South Carolina state senators
American politicians convicted of fraud
South Carolina politicians convicted of crimes
20th-century American businesspeople
Prisoners and detainees of the United States federal government